The Changi Murals are a set of five paintings of biblical theme painted by Stanley Warren, a British bombardier and prisoner-of-war (POW) interned at the Changi Prison, during the Japanese occupation of Singapore in World War II (WWII). His murals were completed under difficult conditions of sickness, limited materials and hardships. With a message of universal love and forgiveness, they helped to uplift the spirits of the POWs and sick when they sought refuge in the prison chapel.

After the war, the walls of the chapel were distempered over, hiding the murals from view. They were forgotten until its rediscovery in 1958. Due to their historical significance, an international search was conducted to locate the original painter in helping to restore the damaged and faded murals. Stanley was eventually found in 1959 and, after much persuasion, agreed to assist in the restoration project. He made three trips to Singapore between 1963 and 1988 to restore his former paintings. Due to Stanley's advanced age, only four of the original murals were fully restored. In the 1990s, the former site of the murals was gazetted as a Heritage Site by the National Heritage Board of Singapore.

History

Stanley Warren was born in England in 1917. He was talented in art from young and was a religious man. Stanley was employed as a commercial designer producing poster ads with the Grenada organisation before the war. In January 1940, he enlisted in the army to join the fight against Nazi Germany and was posted to the Royal Regiment of Artillery as an Observation Post Assistant. His responsibilities included having to make quick drawings of panoramas used to plot targets for the guns.

Changi
In early 1942, he was posted overseas to Malaya (former name for Malaysia) with the 15th Field Regiment Royal Artillery after the Japanese had invaded Malaya and Thailand, and Pearl Harbor had been bombed. Upon their arrival, their fight against the Japanese was brutal and short-lived, and soon his battalion began retreating to Singapore. The Changi Garrison, a heavily fortified coastal defence where most of the British forces were based, consisted of three army barracks; the 2nd Battalion Gordon Highlanders in the Selarang Barracks, the Royal Engineers in Kitchener Barracks, and the 9th Coastal Artillery Regiment of the Royal Artillery in Roberts Barracks. By 12 February, the situation in Singapore was desperate and Lieutenant-General Arthur Ernest Percival, General Officer Commanding of HQ Malaya Command, ordered the Changi Garrison to withdraw to Singapore Town. After the British surrender of Singapore on 15 February 1942, Stanley and Allied POWs were ordered to march to Changi for internment; the 15,000 Australians went into Selarang Barracks and the British to Roberts and Kitchener Barracks. Stanley was interned at Roberts Barracks and later joined other POWs to work around Singapore, repairing damage inflicted by the Japanese attacks and getting essential services back to working order. Percival was held in Roberts Barracks until, with all senior officers above the rank of lieutenant colonel, he was sent to Formosa (now Taiwan) by the Japanese. The food given to the prisoners was of poor quality and inadequate for men working as slave labour. As a result of this and the harsh treatment meted out by the Japanese guards such as the beatings and executions of escaped prisoners, the men's health and morale began to suffer in the long run.

St Luke's Chapel
During one of the work parties, Stanley was sent to build a road and stairs leading to a memorial to the Japanese dead on Bukit Batok Hill (Marked with a Bukit Batok Memorial plaque today, only the stairs and road called Lorong Sesuai are still there to be seen). The chaplain of the regiment, well aware of Stanley's religious conviction and artistic background, requested him to decorate the asbestos walls at the altar area of a small open attap-roofed chapel at Bukit Batok. With charcoal salvaged from around the camp, he drew two murals: Nativity, which featured a Malay Madonna and Descent from the Cross in which he included soldiers in uniforms, using his comrades as models. By then, he was becoming ill and was suffering from a severe renal disorder complicated by amoebic dysentery. On 23 May 1942, Stanley was lying comatose and was sent to Roberts Barracks in Changi which was converted for use as a hospital for POWs to recuperate.

By mid-August 1942, Stanley had recovered enough to be moved to the dysentery wing at Block 151 of Roberts Barracks. Padres Chambers and Payne had heard that Stanley had decorated the prisoners' chapel at Bukit Batok. So they asked him if he would do some paintings for St Luke's Chapel, which was recently converted from the ground floor of Block 151, near the area where Stanley was recuperating. The Chapel was dedicated to St Luke the Physician. Stanley agreed, and sought inspiration for the proposed paintings in the Gospels.

The five murals
On 30 August 1942, at the time when Stanley was preparing the draft drawings of the murals, the Japanese began an action which would become known as the Selarang Barracks Incident. It was an incident concerning seventeen thousand Anglo-Australian POWs, who were forced to vacate their buildings and be exposed for nearly five days in the open without water or sanitation for refusing to sign a "No Escape Pledge". Against this backdrop, Stanley began to paint the murals. No one had asked the Japanese for permission to draw and at no stage did they interfere with his work. Considering the purpose of the murals, Stanley felt that the Chapel was basically dedicated to peace and reconciliation, and so he choose universal themes for the murals which would embrace all mankind. Paint was not readily available in the camp, but with the aid of the other prisoners, who unquestionably put themselves at great risk, materials to make the paint were gradually acquired—brown camouflage paint, a small amount of crimson paint, white oil paint and billiard chalk were found and brought for Stanley use. Despite still being very ill, Stanley set to work on the murals in early September 1942. His illness meant that he could only paint for a limited period each day, for perhaps 15 minutes at a time followed by a rest. To compensate as much as he could for the lack of coloured paint, Stanley resorted to using large brush strokes and big areas of solid colour when painting. In September 1942, a few weeks after Stanley began painting the murals, he was informed that his work party was to be sent north to Thailand to work on the Thai-Burma Railway. A colonel in charge of the hospital, who knew of his work-in-progress murals, intervened to have Stanley transferred back to the hospital so that he could continue on his work in the Chapel. Most of Stanley's unit who went to the Thai-Burma Railway never returned. Stanley recounted: "Had I gone with them, most certainly, I would have died. So the murals very directly saved my life in the way I could never have foreseen... It's a terrible sense of debt... that one feels to the chapel."

By Christmas 1942, he completed his first mural, the Nativity. Altogether, Stanley managed to produce five large murals on the walls of the Chapel, each mural being about three metres long, in the following order:

Nativity
Ascension
Crucifixion
Last Supper
St Luke in Prison

All of them were subjects which are at the very heart of Christian belief. The completed murals uplifted the spirits of the POWs and sick when they sought refuge in the Chapel. Stanley never put his name on any of his paintings as he considered them "a gift to God". In May 1944, Block 151 with the St Luke Chapel's inspiring murals was designated to become a store for an airfield nearby. The lower portion of St Luke in Prison mural was almost completely destroyed when it was demolished to make a link to an adjoining room. The walls of the Chapel were distempered over, hiding the murals from view. Stanley was later sent to Kranji in the north of Singapore, not far from the Causeway to Malaya, and remained there until the Japanese surrender on 15 August 1945. After the war, Stanley returned to England believing that his murals had been destroyed by Allied bombing towards the end of the war. He married and became an art teacher at the Sir William Collins School, later South Camden Community School and currently Regent High School in Somers Town, London.

Rediscovery
Forgotten for nearly 13 years, the Changi Murals were accidentally rediscovered in 1958 by servicemen of the Royal Air Force (RAF) occupying the Roberts Barracks. The Chapel was again used as a store, and later as accommodation by the RAF. Once rediscovered, the distemper coating covering the murals was carefully removed – four complete murals and the top-quarter of a fifth were revealed. As there was no signature on any of the murals, a search for the artist was undertaken but failed after initial investigations. By a stroke of luck, the artist's name came to light in the RAF Changi Education Library of all places. A reader came across a book titled The Churches of the Captivity in Malaya, mentioning about the Chapel of St Luke in Roberts Barracks and the artist's name – Bombardier Stanley Warren. The Daily Mirror was notified and again went to work looking for the known artist. In February 1959, he was found living in London with his wife and son. He was shocked when he saw the photo of his mural of the Crucifixion, when a keen-eyed colleague of his showed him the papers.

Restoration
In 1960, the RAF contacted Stanley and the idea of restoring the murals was brought up. He was initially reluctant to return to restore his works due to the painful memories of war and captivity the murals would bring back to him: "I didn't immediately want to come. I felt that there would be some sort of... trauma. I'm trying to forget this, you know, I tried so hard... It took years really to eliminate the memories and fears... the long drawn out experience and really waiting for death over three and a half years, it's long time to expect death. And I really tried to forget... But of course I was never able to do that."

After much persuasion, he overcame his fear and eventually made three trips to Singapore to restore his murals in December 1963, July 1982 and May 1988. The 1982 restoration was more intensive and the invaluable assistance given to Warren by the officers and boys of the SAF Boys' School enabled the bulk of the work to be completed. Of the original five murals, only one was not fully restored; the mural of St Luke in Prison. Stanley's original tracing of the drawing was missing, and he could not remember the details of the missing portion. In 1985, Stanley's original drawing was discovered in the memorabilia of Wally Hammond who had been a fellow prisoner with Stanley. These original sketches were subsequently donated to the National Archives of Singapore. From the original, Stanley painted a small picture, which was placed below the remaining piece of the mural in 1988. He was, by then, not fit enough to restore the actual mural.

On 20 February 1992, Stanley died in his home in Bridport, England at the age of 75.

Parliamentary discussions
Stanley's murals were discussed in the British Parliament in October 1968. Charles Morris, minister of parliament for Openshaw, asked the Defence Ministry, Denis Healy, to consider moving the murals to England. His proposal was unsuccessful when the Singapore Ministry of Defence decided to take responsibility of the murals and to keep them in good condition for display in 1969. (Singapore gained independence from Britain in August 1965). In addition, a copy of one of the murals painted by Stanley had been brought to England and installed in the Garrison Church at Larkhill in Wiltshire.

The murals today

The three-storey Block 151 of Roberts Barracks (off Martlesham Road) still stands today, but is now part of the Ministry of Defence's Changi Airbase Camp. Most of the buildings surrounding Block 151 were demolished in July 2003. However, for public interest, a replica of Stanley Warren's murals is also on display at the Changi Chapel and Museum, along with an audio-visual theatre that screens videos about POW life, display of POW belongings and collection of books about Singapore during WWII.

Since 1993, the Changi Murals, Changi Prison, and other WWII sites in Singapore are part of a Battlefield Tour organised by the National Institute of Education and the Ministry of Defence, a bi-annual five-day residential National Awareness programme to create greater awareness of national and security issues among trainee teachers.

Commemoration
In November 1994, a two-man British team was in Singapore to film the Changi Murals and Kranji War Memorial for a BBC documentary, for the Commonwealth War Graves Commission which marked the 50th Anniversary of the end of World War II.

On 15 February 2002, more than 250 former POWs and their families from Australia, New Zealand and the United Kingdom came over to Singapore for a reunion-cum-memorial service that was held at the Changi Chapel and Museum, and a tour of the Changi Murals and the Selarang Camp. The event was organised by the Singapore Tourism Board to mark the 60th anniversary of the fall of Singapore.

See also 
Double Tenth Incident
James Clavell
Battle of Kranji

Notes

References 

History of Singapore
British rule in Singapore
Tourist attractions in Singapore
Changi
Murals
English paintings
Modern paintings
1943 paintings